Collings Guitars is an Austin, Texas based stringed instrument manufacturer. The company was founded in 1973 by Bill Collings (August 9, 1948 – July 14, 2017). In addition to acoustic guitars they also make electric guitars, archtop guitars, mandolins, and ukuleles.

Company history

Collings attended Ohio University as a pre-med student in the early 1970s, yet withdrew from his studies in order to work in machining, which he continued for five years. Within this time period, he built his first guitar. In 1975 he moved to Houston, Texas, where he begun work for a pipeline/oil-field company, as an engineer. Whilst also improving his guitar manufacturing skills after work-hours. Three years later he met musician Lyle Lovett (then a college student), who interviewed the fellow guitar-builder for the school newspaper, Collings told Texas Monthly. Lovett, who was impressed by the acoustics of Collings guitars, went on to purchase the 29th guitar he ever manufactured.

In the early 1980s, Collings prepared to move shop as far as San Diego, California - yet was unable to, instead residing in Austin, Texas. He begun work, sharing a space with fellow luthiers; Tom Ellis (mandolin builder) and Mike Stevens. Only a few years after, taking a more 'serious' approach in the pursuit of his craft, by moving into his own, one-stall garage shop.

George Gruhn, a vintage-guitar collector/seller in Nashville, hired Collings to make 25 guitars in, 1987. With Collings eventually receiving viable recognition from competing guitar stores, as well as various press-pieces about his products (magazines). Two years later, he hired his first employee and consequently, the company begun to excel even further.

At the 2006, Summer NAMM Show, the company grew to include the manufacturing of electric-guitars (as opposed to the previously mentioned, manufacturing of exclusively acoustic-guitars), producing the following three models; the I-35, the CL (City Limits), and the 290.

In addition to the manufacture of acoustic/electric-guitars, the company begun production of mandolins and ukuleles. As of May 2012, the company had roughly 85 employees and manufactured 6-7 acoustic guitar models, 3 electric, 2 mandolin and 2 ukuleles, per day.

In 2014, it was announced that the company would be producing a guitar based on a currently popular depression-era design. These guitars being sold under the Waterloo brand.

Models

14-fret acoustic guitars
 D Series: The square-shouldered 14-fret dreadnought is the most popular steel-string acoustic guitar body shape in the world. Collings D Series guitars are often employed by bluegrass flat pickers who must compete with inherently louder instruments such as banjos and fiddles.
 OM Series: The 'OM' (for Orchestra Model) is a 14-fret model that is popular with fingerstyle guitar soloists who choose to play on steel strings. The OM is also used in flatpicking.
 00 Series: With a short scale the 14-fret 00 series is a smaller and often more comfortable alternative to the OM that manages to provide similar volume and range.
 0 Series: With the exception of the Baby, the 0 is Collings' smallest guitar and is offered with the same shorter scale found on the 12-fret 00.
 Baby Series: Collings' smallest guitar, approximately a 3/4 size version of their OM. 12 1/2 inches wide in the lower bout with a 24 1/8 inch scale.
 CJ Series: The Collings Jumbo is their version of the classic slope-shouldered dreadnought.
 SJ Series: The SJ is Collings' version of what is commonly called a small Jumbo. Although the 16 inch lower bout is slightly wider than a dreadnought, and the sides almost as deep, the tight curve at the waist creates in a very different sound chamber. SJs, especially examples in maple, typically have a more pronounced midrange response when compared to a dreadnought.
 C10 Series: Based on parlor guitars first introduced around the same time as the OM, the Collings C10 is a leaner alternative, with the narrow waist and small upper bout.

12-fret acoustic guitars

 DS Series: The original 12-fret dreadnought shape.
 00 Series: Collings offers the 00 in its original, 12-fret configuration. This guitar shape was first designed around the time of the Civil War. Its dimensions are similar to a typical classical guitar, with a slotted headstock and small pyramid bridge.
 000 Series: The 12-fret 000 has the same general appearance as the Collings 00, but in a larger size with longer string scale. Although it's the same width and depth as the OM, the longer body typically produces more bass and overall volume.

Mandolins

Collings began producing mandolins in 1999, and offers A-style and F-style mandolins as well as mandolas. In addition to making the A and F body shapes, Collings also makes f-hole and oval hole mandolins. Collings mandolins are one of the most highly regarded brands of quality, US built, mandolins and mandolas.

Electric guitars
 290: Named after the highway where the Collings factory is located. Features two hand-wound P90 pickups from Jason Lollar.
 360: Similar in shape to a Gibson Les Paul, the 360 is slightly thinner and lighter.
 CL and CL Deluxe: the City Limits is crafted from seasoned maple and Honduran mahogany. It is lightweight, contoured for comfort and style, and features a hand-set mortise and tenon neck joint.
 Collings I-35: Named for Austins infamous traffic artery, the I-35 is aesthetically reminiscent of a Gibson ES-335. The body is pared down slightly at 15" wide, and it has a slightly more angular shape that comparatively reduces its size and weight.
 SoCo Deluxe: Named after Austin's funky and eclectic South Congress Avenue, the SoCo Deluxe brings in elements from both the I-35 and CL models to create a unique hybrid.

Archtop guitars

 Standard: Collings Archtops come with a lower bout width of 16-inch, 17-inch, and 18-inch. Based on the earliest American f-hole archtops of the 1920s, the 16-inch archtops are a rarity among modern archtop models in that they are designed to be played as acoustic guitars.
 CL Jazz: Built with a fully hollow one-piece Honduran mahogany body, carved European spruce top, and modern stylings.

Ukuleles
Collings began producing ukuleles in 2010, and offers a variety of models in both concert and tenor sizes. Collings ukuleles are made in 3 main "trim" levels UC1, UC2, UC3, and UT1, UT2, and UT3. UC= Ukulele Concert, UT=Ukulele Tenor and the trim level is higher as the number goes higher. Collings either ceased or slowed ukulele production around 2014 when, it was rumored, they shifted resources to produce the new line of Waterloo guitars. Collings has maintained that they will resurrect ukulele production at some point and is still doing some custom orders. Collings ukuleles are very highly regarded for their impeccable, light build quality which produces a marvelous tone.

Notable users
 Marcus Mumford
 Ryan Adams
 Lyle Lovett 
 Jerry Jeff Walker 
 Julian Lage
 Antoine Boyer
 Brandi Carlile  
 Robert Earl Keen
 Phoebe Bridgers
 Tyler Childers
 Matt Nathanson
 Charlie Sexton
 Prince

References

External links
 Official website

Guitar manufacturing companies of the United States
Manufacturing companies established in 1973
Manufacturing companies based in Austin, Texas
1973 establishments in Texas
Mandolin makers